Glen Forest Moody B.E.M. (1909–1989) was a Welsh middleweight and light heavyweight boxer. Moody came from a notable family of boxers, six of his brothers fought professionally, with the most successful being British and Empire middleweight boxing champion Frank Moody. Glen Moody was Wales middleweight champion, winning the title in 1930 and successfully defended it on four occasions. Moody later moved up to light Middleweight and won the Wales title at that weight too.

Personal history

Boxing career
Moody was born in Pontypridd, Wales in 1909. Moody was one of seven boxing brothers, the most notable of whom were Frank and Jack. Moody started boxing at the age of 14, and his first recorded professional bout was at the age of 16 when he met Jack Morgan at the Pillgwenlly Labour Hall in Newport on 9 January 1928. The fight went the full ten rounds and the referee decided the match was a draw. Just a month later Moody was fighting in the National Sporting Club in London, a points decision win over Jack Butler from Chesterfield. By the end of the year he was travelling to Liverpool to fight at The Stadium.

In 1939 Moody was appearing as far as Scotland, and fought the Scottish Middleweight champion, Steve McCall in Edinburgh. Although he lost via technical knockout in the tenth to McCall, Moody was impressing enough in his home country to garner a shot at the Wales middleweight title. A challenge was arranged against the title holder, Jerry Daley, who had won the belt just three months prior. The two met at Judges Hall in Trealaw on 15 February 1930, for a 15-round contest. The bout went the distance, and the referee awarded Daley the decision.

Towards the end of 1930 Moody faced Gunnar Andersson, the Swedish Welterweight champion, in London. The points decision went to Moody, but when the two met for a rematch Gothenburg less than a month later, Moody lost in round seven. In March 1931 Moody was given a rematch for Daley's Welsh title. Again the fight went the full fifteen rounds, but this time, in front of his home crowd, Moody was awarded the decision and the Welsh Middleweight title.

He was the subject of This Is Your Life in March 1962 when he was surprised by Eamonn Andrews in the foyer of London's Café Royal.

Military career
With the outbreak of the Second World War, Moody enlisted in the Royal Engineers and was mobilised to France. After the Fall of France, Moody was one of the soldiers evacuated at Dunkirk. On 14 March 1941, while stationed at Clydebank in Scotland, Moody was involved in the rescue of a civilian in a recently bombed building for which he received the British Empire Medal. His BEM citation reads:

References

External links
 

1909 births
1989 deaths
Welsh male boxers
Middleweight boxers
Light-heavyweight boxers
Sportspeople from Pontypridd
Royal Engineers soldiers
Recipients of the British Empire Medal
British Army personnel of World War II